The 2020–21 Texas Tech Lady Raiders basketball team represented Texas Tech University in the 2020–21 NCAA Division I women's basketball season. The Lady Raiders were led by first year head coach Krista Gerlich. They played their homes games at United Supermarkets Arena and were members of the Big 12 Conference.

Prior to the season Marlene Stollings was fired after two years as head coach.  USA Today revealed in a story published on August 5, 2020, that 12 players left Texas Tech since Stollings became head coach in 2018 over accusations that Stollings and her staff were verbally abusive and subject players to dangerous forms of conditioning, for instance a requirement for players to have a 90 percent heart rate in practice and games. The day after that story was published, Texas Tech fired Stollings for cause. Shortly after her firing, Krista Gerlich was hired as the new head coach.

They finished the season 10–15, 5–13 in Big 12 play to finish in seventh place. In the Big 12 Tournament, they lost to Kansas State in the First Round. They were not invited to the NCAA tournament or the WNIT.

Previous season 

The Lady Raiders finished the season 18–11, 7–11 in Big 12 play to finish tied for sixth place. They were scheduled to be the seventh seed in the Big 12 Tournament, but it was cancelled before it began due to the COVID-19 pandemic. The NCAA women's basketball tournament and WNIT were also canceled.

Roster

Schedule

Source:

|-
!colspan=6 style=| Regular season

|-
!colspan=12 style=| Big 12 Women's Tournament

Rankings

The Coaches Poll did not release a Week 2 poll and the AP Poll did not release a poll after the NCAA Tournament.

See also
2020–21 Texas Tech Red Raiders basketball team

References

Texas Tech Lady Raiders basketball seasons
Texas Tech
Texas Tech
Texas Tech